Eros is the name of the first (and, to date, only) recording made by the French progressive rock band Dün. The record was self-released as a vinyl LP; a thousand copies were printed and sold by the band at concerts.

Track listing

Original 1981 album
"L'épice" (Jean Geeraerts) - 9:30
"Arrakis" (Pascal Vandenbulcke) - 9:40
"Bitonio" (Vandenbulcke) - 7:15
"Eros" (Geeraerts) - 10:28

Bonus tracks on 2012 re-issue
"Arrakis" (1979 version) - 5:44
"Bitonio" (1979 version) - 10:24
"Arrakis" (1978 version) - 5:12
"Eros" (1978 version) - 7:16
"Acoustic Fremen" (Geeraerts, Vandenbulcke, Philippe Portejoie; 1978 recording) - 6:26

Personnel
Jean Geeraerts: electric & acoustic guitars
Bruno Sabathe: piano, synthesizers
Alain Termolle: xylophone, vibraphone, percussion
Pascal Vandenbulcke: flute
Thierry Tranchant: bass
Laurent Bertaud: drums
Philippe Portejoie: saxophone (7 & 9)

Production
Recorded & Engineered by Etienne Conod at Studio Sunrise in Kirchberg, Switzerland.
2012 remaster by Udi Koomran for Soleil Zeuhl Records

External links
"Eros" by Dun at progarchives.com
Songwriting and Production Credits for the album

1981 albums
Dün (band) albums